Senna Comasco is a comune (municipality) in the Province of Como in the Italian region Lombardy, located about  north of Milan and about  south of Como.

The municipality of Senna Comasco contains the frazione (subdivision) Navedano.

Senna Comasco borders the following municipalities: Cantù, Capiago Intimiano, Casnate con Bernate, Como, Cucciago.

Demographic evolution

References

Cities and towns in Lombardy